Luz Margarita Cecilia García Guzmán (born April 15, 1977) is a Dominican TV hostess, theatre and film actress, and beauty pageant title holder. García is known in Puerto Rico as Lucy Amado.

Career

Modeling 
García started her career as a model in Puerto Rico, then she moved back to the Dominican Republic where she participated in the beauty pageant Miss Universe Dominicana 1999, she won and represented her country in the Miss Universe 1999 contest; after that, she represented again her country now at Miss World 1999.

Radio and television

“Vale Más” stage name: 'Lucy Amado' (1996-2000)
“Hola Gente” (2000-2001)
“El Show del Mediodía” (2001-2002)
“Formalmente Informal” (2002)
“Botando el Golpe” (radio, 2003)
“El Escándalo del 13” (2003-2004)
“Noche de Luz” (2004–present)
“Todo Bien” (2006-2008)

Acting 
"Prefiero un marido infiel" (2002)
"El buhó y la gatica" (2003)
"¿Qué sexo prefiere Javier?" (2005)
"Mujeres en cuatro posiciones" (2006)
"Orgasmos" (2007)
"El rey de Najayo" (2011)
"El que mucho abarca" (2014)

Personal life 
In April 2008 she married Maj. Gen. José Miguel Soto Jiménez, former Minister of the Dominican armed forces, in a villa in La Romana. They had a son, Miguel Ángel (born 2010), and divorced on 2011.

References

External links 
Website

1979 births
Dominican Republic beauty pageant winners
Dominican Republic female models
Dominican Republic film actresses
Dominican Republic people of Spanish descent
Dominican Republic stage actresses
Dominican Republic television presenters
Living people
Miss Dominican Republic
Miss Universe 1999 contestants
Miss World 1999 delegates
People from Espaillat Province
People from Moca, Dominican Republic
Dominican Republic women television presenters
White Dominicans